Michael Dickman is an American poet born August 20, 1975 in Portland, Oregon. His work has appeared in The New Yorker, The American Poetry Review, Field, Tin House, and Narrative Magazine. Michael Dickman currently teaches at Princeton University.

Education and background 
Dickman attended and graduated from La Salle Catholic College Preparatory, after which he attended five colleges (Portland State, the University of San Francisco, Portland Community College, Marylhurst University and the University of Oregon). He received a fellowship from The James A. Michener Center for Writers at the University of Texas. In 2009, he received an Alfred Hodder Fellowship at Princeton University.

Career 
His poem "Returning to Church" was awarded the 2008 Narrative Prize by Narrative Magazine. Dickman's first book, The End of the West, was published in 2009 by Copper Canyon Press. His second book, Flies (Copper Canyon Press, 2011), won the 2010 James Laughlin Award from the Academy of American Poets. He is also the coauthor, with his twin brother Matthew Dickman, of the 2012 poetry collection 50 American Plays, published by Copper Canyon Press.

He and his brother Matthew starred as the pre-cog twins, Arthur and Dashiell respectively, in the 2002 Steven Spielberg film Minority Report.

Michael and Matthew Dickman were the subject of an April 6, 2009, New Yorker profile.

Michael Dickman's poem "Scholls Ferry Rd.," published in Poetry Magazine in 2020, received criticism for its use of racist language. Don Share, the Editor in Chief of Poetry, subsequently resigned, and Dickman requested that the poem be removed from circulation.

Family 
He is married and has two children.

Bibliography

Collections
 
 
 
 Green Migraine (Copper Canyon Press, 2016)

List of poems

References

Poets from Oregon
Living people
Writers from Portland, Oregon
Portland State University alumni
University of San Francisco alumni
Marylhurst University alumni
The New Yorker people
University of Oregon alumni
Michener Center for Writers alumni
1975 births